Dong-il, also spelled Dong-ill or Tong-il, is a Korean masculine given name. Its meaning differs based on the hanja used to write each syllable of the name. There are 24 hanja with the reading "dong" and ten hanja with the reading "il" on the South Korean government's official list of hanja which may be registered for use in given names. One pair of hanja used to write this name also correspond to a number of different Japanese given names, including the on-yomi Tōichi and kun-yomi such as Harukazu.

People with this name include:
Han Tong-il (born 1941), South Korean pianist
Shin Dong-il (born 1968), South Korean film director
Sung Dong-il (born 1969), South Korean actor
Dong-ill Shin (born 1980s), South Korean-born American pianist
Hwang Dong-il (born 1986), South Korean volleyball player

See also
List of Korean given names

References

Korean masculine given names